Starmancer is an upcoming construction and management simulation game developed by Ominux Games and published by Chucklefish. Its game state is viewed from an isometric perspective, taking place in a procedurally generated galaxy. The game will be released for Microsoft Windows, macOS, and Linux. A closed alpha version was released in April 2019.

Gameplay 
In Starmancer, the player plays as a Starmancer Core, which is a human-artificial intelligence hybrid who has been irreversibly fused with their core. The game emphasizes player freedom, with the main objective of the game being the preservation of the Starmancer Core and station. Unlike typical colony-management games, Starmancer does not end when all colonists are dead, instead giving the player the ability to create new ones at will.

Development 
Starmancer was officially unveiled via Kickstarter on February 12, 2018 and achieved full funding within three days. Starmancer has been in development for 5 years as of 2020. On April 2, 2018, Ominux added an additional programmer to the team, who quietly left the project shortly before E3 2019. On April 22, 2019, the game was released into closed alpha for Kickstarter backers and those who pre-ordered via Backerkit. Starmancer also received additional attention at E3 2019, where they showed off the game as part of the Indie Games Show. The game is being published by Chucklefish.

References

External links 
 
 

Chucklefish games
Construction and management simulation games
Early access video games
Linux games
MacOS games
Science fiction video games
Simulation video games
Single-player video games
Upcoming video games
Video games developed in Sweden
Video games developed in the United States
Windows games